Conde Vrolok (Count Vrolok; "vampire" in Slovak) is a telenovela produced and broadcast by Televisión Nacional de Chile (TVN) in 2009, succeeding ¿Dónde está Elisa? Recording began on 11 August and the first episode aired on 3 November of that year. With an average rating of 44.2 points, between 10:38 and 11:16, and a peak of 54, it became the most successful debut of a TV series in the TVN night slot, which can be largely attributed to the popularity of the aforementioned telenovela which it replaced.

The scripts were written by Pablo Illanes, Nona Fernández, Francisca Bernardi, and Juan Pablo Olave, and its first promotional spot was aired on 6 October 2009 during the nightly series ¿Dónde está Elisa?

Towards the end of its run its ratings had dropped significantly; its average (at the end of May 2010, counting from its debut) had been 20.3 points, but in the last two weeks of that month it dipped to 18 points, "a situation very different from what happened with its predecessor, that in its final stage averaged 40 rating points."

Plot
In times of war, 1880, a mysterious stranger and his companions arrive at a small town called Santa Bárbara.

The people react with distrust to the visit of this mysterious character; the arrival of this attractive, seductive, and elegant man completely changes the destiny of this town. Now back in Santa Bárbara, Count Domingo Vrolok (Alvaro Rudolphy) unleashes the passions of women and the envy of men, while suspicions about the foreigner's past increase. Soon, the count will have to face his condition after falling in love with the wrong woman, Emilia Verdugo (Francisca Lewin). But the legendary curse that afflicts those of his race will be more powerful than love.

Vrolok, being a vampire, can not understand human feelings clearly. In addition, a love from the past returns to confuse things further; the spirit of Teresa Salvatierra has returned to recover her lost love, Vrolok. Domingo is at a crossroads between two loves, Emilia and Teresa.

To everyone's surprise, Emilia is expecting a daughter of Domingo. However, the little one is devouring her mother inside. Desperate situations call for extreme measures. Once the daughter is born, Domingo and the others discover, in spite of themselves, that the girl is an ancient vampire; that is, she is weak before the light, garlic, roses, etc., besides having no reflection, because she is half human. And that's not all: Lucio Martino (Bastián Bodenhöfer), Vrolok's old and powerful enemy, has arrived in Santa Bárbara to take Montserrat (Luz Valdivieso) with him and kill anyone who gets in his way.

Cast
 Álvaro Rudolphy as Conde Domingo Vrolok
  as Emilia Verdugo
 Claudia Di Girolamo as Doña Elena Medrano / Teresa Salvatierra
 Francisco Reyes as Froilán Donoso
 Luz Valdivieso as Montserrat Vrolok
 Marcelo Alonso as General Juan de Dios Verdugo
 Alejandra Fosalba as Beatriz Buzeta
 Francisca Imboden as Hermana Victoria Buzeta
 Julio Milostich as Padre Faustino Rengifo
  as Gabriel Donoso
 Antonia Santa María as Úrsula Donoso
  as Santiago Verdugo
  as Dario Gutiérrez
  as Tadeo
  as Luisa Verdugo
  as Fernando Gutiérrez 
 Violeta Vidaurre as Ercilia Núñez
  as Modesta Pérez
 Bastián Bodenhöfer as Barón Lucio Martino
 Héctor Morales as Capitán Maximiliano Ariztia
  as Teresa Salvatierra
  as Agustina Ariztia
  as Pancracio Tancredo
  as Soldado González
  as Soldado Vampiro
  as Prostitute
 Ángela Vallejos as María
 Paulina Eguiluz as Lucía Cienfuegos de Vrolok
 María de los Ángeles Calvo as Ana Mardones

References

External links
 

2009 telenovelas
2009 Chilean television series debuts
2010 Chilean television series endings
Televisión Nacional de Chile telenovelas
Vampires in television